South Jhitakaiya is a town and Village Development Committee, near by Dewapur- Chowk/Pokhara/Mandir/School/Police Station and Pashah River, Bara District in the Narayani Zone of south-eastern Nepal. At the time of the 1991 Nepal census it had a population of 7,235.

References

External links
UN map of the municipalities of Bara District

Populated places in Bara District